Cesar Mora (born October 2, 1961) is a leading musician and actor in Colombia.  He was born in Cali, and later spent fourteen years as part of the famed Son Del Pueblo band.

Cesar composed the songs in the Colombian musical "Y Se Armo La Mojiganga" in which he also played the main character.  His most recent albums are recorded with The Maria Canela Band under the musical direction of Luis Arroyo.

His most notable film role is Sargento Juvenal Garcia on El Zorro, la espada y la rosa.  He won the Simón Bólivar Prize for Television in 1988 for his role in El Confesor.

Discography

Albums
Hacerlo Bien  2008

Filmography

References

External links
  Cesar Mora on LoveCat Music
 Cesar Mora on CD Baby

1961 births
Living people
Colombian musicians